Olavarría is a city in the province of Buenos Aires, Argentina.

The settlement was officially founded on 25 November 1867, and named in honour of Colonel José Valentín de Olavarría (1801–1845), an early Argentine military leader.

Notable people
 
 
Guillermo Avalos (born 1923), athlete
Pedro de la Vega (born 2001), footballer
Juan José Longhini (born 1984), footballer
José Zampicchiatti (1900–1984), cyclist

References

External links

 Municipal website
 Olavarria online news
 El Popular, local newspaper
 Ciudad de Olavarría: Información, museos, etc
 Verte TV, local TV station

Populated places in Buenos Aires Province
Populated places established in 1867
Cities in Argentina
Argentina